James Greenwood (1806 in England – 26 September 1870) was an amateur English cricketer who made his first-class debut for Hampshire against Marylebone Cricket Club (MCC) in 1842. Greenwood played 7 first-class matches for Hampshire from 1842 to 1845, with his final appearance for the county coming against Petworth.

In his 7 matches for the county he scored 83 runs at a batting average of 7.54 and a high score of 40.

Greenwood died at Great Marlow, Buckinghamshire on 26 September 1870.

External links
James Greenwood at Cricinfo
James Greenwood at CricketArchive

1806 births
1870 deaths
English cricketers
Hampshire cricketers